Vincent Bernardet (born 23 April 1981) is a French footballer who plays as a left-back for FC Déolois in the Championnat National 3.

Career
Bernardet has made 140 appearances in Ligue 2 and played in the 2008–09 UEFA Cup first round with Swiss side AC Bellinzona.

References

External links
 

Living people
1981 births
Association football defenders
French footballers
Ligue 2 players
Championnat National players
Championnat National 2 players
Championnat National 3 players
Swiss Super League players
LB Châteauroux players
Stade Lavallois players
Stade Brestois 29 players
FC Gueugnon players
AC Bellinzona players
Bourges 18 players
AS Beauvais Oise players
SR Colmar players
ASC Biesheim players
SO Romorantin players